The 4th South Carolina Regiment was raised on November 13, 1775, at Charleston, South Carolina, for service with the South Carolina Troops and later became part of Continental Army.

Officers
The commanders of the 4th Regiment were:

 Lt. Col./Col. Owen Roberts (1775-1778), killed at the Battle of Stono Ferry
 Col. Barnard Beeckman (1778-1781)

History
The major events in the history of the 4th South Carolina Regiment (Infantry) included:
 November 14, 1775, authorized in the South Carolina Provincial Troops as the 4th South Carolina Regiment. 
 November 20 to December 18, 1775, organized at Charleston to consist of three companies from the greater Charleston area. 
 June 18, 1776, adopted into the Continental Army and assigned to the Southern Department.
 October 18, 1776, expansion of the unit included six companies (Beaufort and Georgetown Independent Companies of Artillery concurrently redesignated as the 4th and 5th Companies). 
 October 18, 1776, expanded to six companies (Beaufort and Georgetown Independent Companies of Artillery concurrently re-designated as the 4th and 5th Companies)
 May 12, 1780, captured at Charleston by the British Army. 
 January 1, 1781, disbanded

Engagements
The unit was engaged in the following battles, skirmishes and sieges:
 June 28, 1776, Battle of Fort Moultrie/Sullivan's Island
 January 6-10, 1779, Fort Morris, Georgia
 February 1, 1779, Fort Lyttleton
 February 3, 1779, Battle of Beaufort/Port Royal Island
 February 21, 1779, Georgetown
 March 3, 1779, Battle of Briar Creek, Georgia
 March 6, 1779, Georgetown
 April 29, 1779, Purrysburg
 May 11, 1779, Charleston Neck
 June 20, 1779, Battle of Stono Ferry
 September 16 - Oct. 18, 1779, Siege of Savannah, Georgia
 December 29, 1779, Siege of Savannah, Georgia
 March 28 - May 12, 1780, Siege of Charleston

See also
 South Carolina Line: 1st, 2nd, 3rd, 4th, 5th, 6th Regiments
 List of South Carolina militia units in the American Revolution

References

Bibliography of the Continental Army in South Carolina compiled by the United States Army Center of Military History, December 10, 1996
 , sources unknown

South Carolina regiments of the Continental Army
Military units and formations established in 1775
Military units and formations disestablished in 1783